Francesco Alciati (2 February 1522 – 20 April 1580) was an Italian Cardinal.

A native of Milan and a relative of Andrea Alciato, he became one of the most important law professors in Milan. His best-known student in Pavia was St Charles Borromeo. He excelled in science and literature and was a model of erudition. Under Pius IV he became a bishop, datary, pro-camerlengo, Cardinal deacon of Santa Maria in Campitelli and Cardinal priest of Santa Susanna. He became Protector of the Order of the Carthusians and Protector of the kingdoms of Spain and Ireland to the Holy See. Under St Pius V he became vice-penitentiary and later grand penitentiary.

He died in office and was buried in Rome in the Carthusian Church of Santa Maria degli Angeli.

References

External links

1522 births
16th-century Italian cardinals
Clergy from Milan
Carthusians
16th-century Italian jurists
Cardinal-nephews
1580 deaths
Members of the Sacred Congregation of the Council